Carlos Rentería may refer to:

 Carlos Alberto Rentería Mantilla (1945-2020), Colombian narcotrafficer and mob boss
 Carlos Rentería (footballer, born 1986), Colombian football striker
 Carlos Rentería (footballer, born 1995), Colombian football defensive midfielder